Outland IV is a collaborative album by Bill Laswell and Pete Namlook, released on February 5, 2000 by FAX +49-69/450464.

Track listing

Personnel 
Adapted from the Outland IV liner notes.
Bill Laswell – electronics
Pete Namlook – electronics, producer
Andre Ruello – cover art

Release history

References

External links 
 Outland IV at Bandcamp
 

2000 albums
Collaborative albums
Bill Laswell albums
Pete Namlook albums
FAX +49-69/450464 albums
Albums produced by Pete Namlook